Zahhak (Persian) – Dragon
 Žaltys (Baltic) – Serpentine fertility spirit
 Zamzummim (Jewish) – Giant
 Zana e malit (Albanian) – Mountain fairy who bless warriors 
 Zână (Romanian) – Nature spirit
 Zashiki-warashi (Japanese) – House spirit
 Zburator (Romanian) – Wolf-headed dragon
 Zduhać (Slavic mythology) – Disembodied, heroic spirit
 Zeus (Greek) – God of lightning and storms
 Zennyo Ryūō (Japanese) – Rain-making dragon
 Zhar-Ptitsa (Slavic) – Glowing bird
 Zhulong (Chinese) – Pig-headed dragon
 Zhū Què (Chinese) – Fire elemental bird
 Žiburinis (Lithuanian) – Forest spirit in the form of a glowing skeleton
 Zilant (Tatar) – Flying chicken-legged reptile
 Zin (West Africa) – Water spirits
 Ziz (Jewish) – Giant bird
 Zlatorog (Slovenia) – White golden-horned deer
 Zmeu (Romanian folklore) – Giant with a habit of kidnapping young girls
 Zmiy – Slavic dragon
 Zombie (Vodou/Worldwide) – Re-animated corpse
 Zouyu (Chinese) - Long and big Cat-like Spirit with a long, red tail
 Zorigami (Japanese) – Animated clock
 Zuijin (Japanese) – Tutelary spirit
 Zunbera-bō (Japanese) – Faceless ghost

Z